John Drewett (born 23 October 1932) is a former English cricketer. He was a wicket-keeper who played for Berkshire.

Drewett, who represented the team in the Minor Counties Championship between 1961 and 1965, made his only List A appearance in his final year at the club, in the 1965 Gillette Cup against Somerset. From the upper-middle order, Drewett scored a single run.

References

External links
John Drewett at Cricket Archive

English cricketers
Berkshire cricketers
Wicket-keepers